"After Like" is a song recorded by South Korean girl group Ive for their third single album of the same name. It was released as the single album's lead single by Starship Entertainment on August 22, 2022.

Background and release
On July 24, 2022, Starship Entertainment announced that Ive would be releasing their third single album, After Like, on August 22. On August 7, the track listing was released, with "After Like" announced as the lead single. On August 19, the music video teaser was released. On August 21, the song was partially pre-released on TikTok. The song was released alongside its music video and the single album on August 22. On November 16, the "holiday remix" version was released on Spotify as part of the Spotify Holiday Singles project.

Composition
The lyrics of "After Like" were written primarily by Seo Ji-eum with Mommy Son, and Rei participating in the writing of rap lyrics. The song was composed and arranged primarily by Ryan S. Jhun and Anders Nilsen;  and Iselin Solheim also participated in composition, while Avin and Slay contributed to arrangement. Musically, "After Like" was described as a pop song that draws from EDM, disco, and house music with lyrics about "showing your love methods with actions rather than your heart". The instrumental break interpolates "I Will Survive" by Gloria Gaynor.

Commercial performance
"After Like" debuted at number three on South Korea's Circle Digital Chart in the chart issue dated August 21–27, 2022; on its component charts, the song debuted at number one on the Circle Download Chart, number seven on the Circle Streaming Chart, and number five on the Circle BGM Chart. In the following week, it ascended to number one on the Circle Digital Chart, and Circle Streaming Chart. The song also debuted at number four on the Billboard South Korea Songs in the chart issue dated September 3, 2022, ascending to number two in the following week. In Japan, the song debuted at number 13 on the Billboard Japan Hot 100 in the chart issue dated August 31, 2022; on its component charts, the song debuted at number ten on the Top Download Songs, number 11 on the Top Streaming Songs. and number four on the Top User Generated Songs. On the Oricon Combined Singles, the song debuted at number 11 in the chart issue dated September 5, 2022.

In Singapore, "After Like" debuted at number two on the RIAS Top Streaming Songs and Top Regional Songs in the chart issue dated August 19–25, 2022. It also debuted at number three on the Billboard Singapore Songs in the chart issue dated September 3, 2022, ascending to number two in the following week. In Malaysia, the song debuted at number 11 on the Billboard Malaysia Songs in the chart issue dated September 3, 2022, ascending to number five in the following week. In Indonesia, the song debuted at number 16 on the Billboard Indonesia Songs in the chart issue dated September 10, 2022. In Philippines, the song debuted at number 11 on the Billboard Philippines Songs in the chart issue dated September 10, 2022. In Hong Kong, the song debuted at number 14 on the Billboard Hong Kong Songs in the chart issue dated September 3, 2022. In Taiwan, the song debuted at number 15 on the Billboard Taiwan Songs in the chart issue dated September 3, 2022, ascending to number five in the following week. In Vietnam, the song debuted at number 10 on the Billboard Vietnam Hot 100 in the chart issue dated September 1, 2022, ascending to number nine in the following week.

In United States, "After Like" debuted at number three on the Billboard World Digital Song Sales in the chart issue dated September 3, 2022. In Canada, the song debuted at number 96 on the Billboard Canadian Hot 100 in the chart issue dated September 10, 2022. In Australia, the song debuted at number 79 on the ARIA Top 100 Singles Chart in the chart issue dated September 5, 2022. In New Zealand, the song debuted at number four on the RMNZ Hot Singles in the chart issue dated August 29, 2022. Globally, the song debuted at number 48 on the Billboard Global 200, and number 27 on the Billboard Billboard Global Excl. U.S in the chart issue dated September 3, 2022.

Promotion
Following the release of After Like, the group performed "After Like" on four music programs in the first week: Mnet's M Countdown on August 25, KBS's Music Bank on August 26, MBC's Show! Music Core on August 27, and SBS's Inkigayo on August 28. In the second week, they performed on six music programs: SBS M's The Show on August 30, MBC M's Show Champion on August 31, M Countdown on September 1, Music Bank on September 2, Show! Music Core on September 3, and Inkigayo on September 4, where they won first place for all appearances except M Countdown and Inkigayo. In the third week, the group performed on three music programs: The Show on September 6, Show Champion on September 7, M Countdown on September 8, where they won first place for all appearances except M Countdown.

Music video
The music video was released alongside the song itself by Starship Entertainment on August 22, 2022. Within an hour of release, the view count surpassed two million, and 16 million within 16 hours of its release.

Accolades

Credits and personnel
Credits adapted from Melon.

 Ive – vocals
 Ive (Rei) – lyrics (rap)
 Seo Ji-eum – lyrics
 Mommy Son – lyrics (rap)
 Ryan S. Jhun – composition, arrangement
 Anders Nilsen – composition, arrangement
  – composition
 Iselin Solheim – composition
 Avin – arrangement
 Slay – arrangement

Charts

Weekly charts

Monthly charts

Year-end charts

Release history

See also
 List of Circle Digital Chart number ones of 2022
 List of Inkigayo Chart winners (2022)
 List of M Countdown Chart winners (2022)
 List of Music Bank Chart winners (2022)
 List of Show Champion Chart winners (2022)
 List of Show! Music Core Chart winners (2022)
 List of The Show Chart winners (2022)

References

Ive songs
2022 singles
2022 songs
Gaon Digital Chart number-one singles
Korean-language songs
Starship Entertainment singles
Songs written by Ryan S. Jhun